Kettle Creek is a  tributary stream of the South Fork South Branch Potomac River in Hardy and Pendleton counties in West Virginia's Eastern Panhandle. Kettle Creek rises on Mitchell Knob (2,717 feet) and flows north along the eastern flanks of Sweedlin Hill (2,303 feet) through Sweedlin Valley in the George Washington National Forest.

Tributaries
Tributaries are listed from the south (source) to north (mouth).

Buck Lick Run
Lick Run
Camp Run
Wilson Run

See also
List of rivers of West Virginia

References

Rivers of Hardy County, West Virginia
Rivers of Pendleton County, West Virginia
Rivers of West Virginia
Tributaries of the Potomac River